John McGinlay (born 8 April 1964) is a Scottish football manager, former professional footballer and scout who is the club ambassador of Bolton Wanderers.

As a player, he was a striker over a 26-year career that saw him notably play in the Premier League for Bolton Wanderers. He also played in the Football League for Shrewsbury Town, Bury, Millwall, Bradford City and Oldham Athletic. He also played non-league football in both Scotland and England for Fort William, Nairn County, Elgin City and Yeovil Town, as well as a spell in New Zealand and the United States with North Shore United, Cincinnati Riverhawks and Cincinnati Kings. He was capped 13 times by Scotland, scoring four goals.

Following retirement, McGinlay had brief spells as manager of both Gresley Rovers and Ilkeston Town. He also returned to the USA as director of coaching for Cincinnati Kings. He later had spells as a scout for the Scottish Football Association, Wigan Athletic, Blackpool and Blackburn Rovers.

Playing career

Early years
A supporter of Celtic in childhood, McGinlay's first senior game was as a 16-year-old for his hometown club Fort William, in a Highland Football League game in August 1980 against Elgin City. Following a year playing in New Zealand either side of two seasons with  Nairn County, and a three-year spell with English Football Conference club Yeovil Town, McGinlay returned to the Highland League with Elgin City in 1988.

He then progressed through English League football, initially playing with Shrewsbury Town then with Bury. After a successful loan spell with Millwall, in which he scored during their unsuccessful participation in the 1991 Football League play-offs, McGinlay moved to The Den permanently for the 1991–92 season. He scored 27 goals in 52 league matches for the London club.

Bolton Wanderers
McGinlay is perhaps best known for his five-year spell with Bolton Wanderers between 1992 and 1997, where his scoring exploits led to him being nicknamed 'Super John'. After his goals eliminated FA Cup holders Liverpool from the competition, he successfully partnered fellow Scot Andy Walker as the  Trotters gained promotion from the third tier in 1993, with McGinlay scoring the match winning penalty in the last fixture against local rivals Preston North End.

Further cup 'giant killings' over teams such as Everton  and Arsenal followed the next year, with McGinlay featuring prominently – he scored 33 goals across all competitions during the campaign, and the team became known in local media as 'white hot' due to the performances. In the 1995 he was in the side which gained  promotion to the Premier League via the play-offs, playing all 120 minutes of the dramatic 4–3 victory over Reading (they were relegated in the subsequent campaign), and also started in the League Cup Final (lost 2–1 to Liverpool) in the same season.

In April 1997, he scored the last goals at Burnden Park, finishing as the club and the division's top scorer with 24 goals from 43 games as Bolton returned to the top level, this time as champions. He scored a hat-trick in a 6–1 cup win over Tottenham Hotspur. He made seven further league appearances for the club at the outset of the next season before joining second-tier Bradford City in November 1997 for £625,000 in what would be an injury-hit move. He later had the Bolton club crest tattooed on his arm.

Later years
McGinlay had short spells with Oldham Athletic and American team Cincinnati Riverhawks before moving into management with non-league sides Ilkeston Town and Gresley Rovers. In 2013, he was also employed as a chief scout by Wigan Athletic,
appointed by former Bolton teammate Owen Coyle during his spell as manager, after spending time working in similar roles in the US with Cincinnati Kings (where he had also finished his playing career after serving as a manager), and with the Scottish Football Association. In 2014, McGinlay took over the 240-year old Horwich pub the Original Bay Horse. He rejoined Bolton Wanderers in an official ambassadorial role in 2020, in an attempt by the club to strengthen their ties with the sports courses held at the University of Bolton, and to bring former players back into contact with the club. On November 14, 2021, McGinlay played in a charity match as part of a team of Bolton Wanderers Legends against the current Bolton first team with the match helping to raise money for the Mother of Bolton player Gethin Jones, who had been diagnosed with Motor neuron disease. The Bolton first team won 7–4, with McGinlay scoring a penalty for the Legends team.

International career
During his time with Bolton, McGinlay earned 13 international caps for Scotland, scoring four goals; his last and most important strike was the only goal of a 1–0 victory over Sweden (which featured a memorable goalkeeping display by Jim Leighton) and helped the national side qualify for 1998 FIFA World Cup, although he did not make the squad for that tournament, nor for the Euro 96 competition. McGinlay lined up for Scotland alongside his childhood friend from Fort William, Duncan Shearer, who also spent much of his career in England – the two never played in the same team at club level. He also featured in the infamous '3-second match' in Estonia and its replay in Monaco, and missed the birth of his daughter in order to travel to Belarus for another qualification game the following year.

Coaching career
Following retirement, McGinlay had brief spells as manager of both Gresley Rovers and Ilkeston Town. He also returned to the USA as director of coaching for Cincinnati Kings. He later had spells as a scout for the Scottish Football Association, Wigan Athletic, Blackpool and Blackburn Rovers.

Honours
Bolton Wanderers
Football League First Division: 1996–97

Individual
First Division PFA Team of the Year: 1996–97

References

External links
 
 
 
  Cincinnati United Soccer Club
 

1964 births
Living people
People from Fort William, Highland
Sportspeople from Highland (council area)
Association football forwards
Scottish footballers
Bolton Wanderers F.C. players
Bradford City A.F.C. players
Bury F.C. players
Elgin City F.C. players
Millwall F.C. players
Oldham Athletic A.F.C. players
Yeovil Town F.C. players
Shrewsbury Town F.C. players
Cincinnati Riverhawks players
Cincinnati Kings players
Scottish football managers
Gresley F.C. managers
Ilkeston Town F.C. managers
Scotland international footballers
Scotland B international footballers
Scottish expatriate footballers
Expatriate association footballers in New Zealand
Expatriate soccer players in the United States
Premier League players
English Football League players
USL Second Division players
Nairn County F.C. players
Highland Football League players
Wigan Athletic F.C. non-playing staff
Scottish expatriate sportspeople in the United States
Scottish expatriate sportspeople in New Zealand
Fort William F.C. players
Outfield association footballers who played in goal